Egypt is a transcontinental country spanning the northeast corner of Africa and southwest corner of Asia by a land bridge formed by the Sinai Peninsula. Egypt's economy depends mainly on agriculture, media, petroleum imports, natural gas, and tourism; there are also more than three million Egyptians working abroad, mainly in Saudi Arabia, the Persian Gulf and Europe. The completion of the Aswan High Dam in 1970 and the resultant Lake Nasser have altered the time-honoured place of the Nile River in the agriculture and ecology of Egypt. A rapidly growing population, limited arable land, and dependence on the Nile all continue to overtax resources and stress the economy.

For further information on the types of business entities in this country and their abbreviations, see "Business entities in Egypt".

Notable firms 
This list includes notable companies with primary headquarters located in the country. The industry and sector follow the Industry Classification Benchmark taxonomy. Organizations which have ceased operations are included and noted as defunct.

See also 
 List of airlines of Egypt
 List of banks in Egypt

References 

Egypt